John Charles Allred (born September 9, 1974) is a former American football tight end who played in the National Football League (NFL) from 1997 to 2002. He was drafted by the Chicago Bears in the 2nd round of the 1997 NFL draft and also played for the Pittsburgh Steelers.

Early life
Born in Del Mar, California, Allred graduated from Torrey Pines High School in 1992. As a high school senior Allred was the defensive player of the year in the Palomar League and a Los Angeles Times first-team tight end, and Torrey Pines was 9–3 in the 1991 season including an eight-game winning streak. 
Allred is now the receiver coach at San Clemente High School.

College career
He played college football at the University of Southern California from 1993 to 1996 after redshirting 1992. At USC, Allred majored in history. In 1993 and 1994, Allred played on special teams. He caught 6 passes for 70 yards in 1995. In his senior season, Allred became the starting tight end.

Professional career
Allred played for the Chicago Bears between 1997 and 2000 and for the Pittsburgh Steelers in 2002.

Post-football
Allred is currently involved in commercial real estate in Southern California and remains an avid supporter of the USC Trojans. He currently owns "Toes on the Nose" surf shop in Laguna Beach, California.

Personal
Allred's older sister, Linda, is married to the NFL's John Lynch.

References

1974 births
Living people
American football tight ends
Chicago Bears players
People from Del Mar, California
Pittsburgh Steelers players
USC Trojans football players
Players of American football from San Diego
Brian Piccolo Award winners